Decio Carafa (1556–1626) was an Archbishop of Naples who had previously served as papal nuncio to the Spanish Netherlands (1606–1607) and to Habsburg Spain (1607–1611).

Life
Carafa was born in Naples in 1556, the son of Ottaviano Carafa, lord of Cerza Piccola, by Marzia Mormile. Trained to the clergy, he became an apostolic notary and domestic prelate in the Roman curia.

He served on a papal mission to Portugal in 1598–1605, after which Pope Paul V appointed him to the titular see of Damascus on 17 May 1606 and papal nuncio to Flanders on 12 June. He left Rome on 9 July, reached Brussels on 1 September, and was received in audience by the ruling Archdukes Albert and Isabella on 6 September 1606.

Carafa served in Flanders for only eight months, his main concern being to encourage the negotiations that led to the Twelve Years' Truce (1609–1621) temporarily ending the Eighty Years' War. In May 1607 he was transferred to Spain, arriving in Madrid on 25 July. He was received in audience by Philip III of Spain on 3 August 1607. In 1609 he convinced Francisco Suarez to write against the claims of James VI and I regarding the 1606 Oath of Allegiance. In 1610 he played a role in dissuading Philip III from making war on France over French claims in the Rhineland and Italy, and encouraging the negotiations that led to the marriage of Louis XIII to Anne of Austria. From day to day he represented papal interests in the ongoing implementation of Tridentine reform in Spain.

On 17 August 1611 he was created cardinal and recalled from Madrid. He did not leave Madrid until January 1612, after his successor's arrival, and was received by the pope on 2 April. On 7 January 1613 he was appointed archbishop of Naples, taking possession of the diocese by procuration on 8 May. He arrived in Naples only two years later, in May 1615.

As archbishop he held three diocesan synods, in 1619, 1622 and 1623, to improve clerical discipline and the fitting celebration of the liturgy. He issued decrees against excesses in ecclesiastical painting and music. He spent a great deal of money on restoring the interior of Naples Cathedral in the Baroque style. He also restored and enlarged the archiepiscopal palace.

As a cardinal, he took part in the conclaves of 1621, that elected Pope Gregory XV, and 1623, that elected Pope Urban VIII.

He died in Naples on 23 January 1626 and was buried in the cathedral.

References

1556 births
1626 deaths
17th-century Italian cardinals
17th-century Italian Roman Catholic archbishops
Archbishops of Naples
Apostolic Nuncios to Flanders
Apostolic Nuncios to Portugal
Apostolic Nuncios to Spain